In medicine  neutrophil to lymphocyte ratio (NLR) is used as a marker of subclinical inflammation. It is calculated by dividing the number of neutrophils by number of lymphocytes, usually from peripheral blood sample, but sometimes also from cells that infiltrate tissue, such as tumor. Recently Lymphocyte Monocyte ratio (LMR) has also been studied as a marker of inflammation including tuberculosis and various cancers.

Uses

Prognosis of cardiovascular diseases

Higher NLR is independent predictor of mortality in patients undergoing angiography or cardiac revascularization.

Prognostic marker in cancer

Increased NLR is associated with poor prognosis of various cancers, such as esophageal cancer or advanced pancreatic cancer.

Prognostic marker in COVID-19

NLR can be used as a prognostic marker for COVID-19 given the significant difference of NLR between those died and recovered from COVID-19.

Reference values
In a recent study, 95% of healthy adult subjects had a ratio   between 0.78 and 3.53. 95% range : 2.5% of healthy adults having less than 0.78, and 2.5% above 3.53.

History
Neutrophil to Lymphocyte ratio was first demonstrated as useful parameter after a correlation of a relationship between the neutrophil lymphocyte ratio to reactions of the immune response was noted. A study in 2001 was conducted by the Department of Anaesthesiology and Intensive Care Medicine, St. Elizabeth Cancer Institute in Bratislava by Zahorec which suggested the routine used of the ratio as a stress factor in clinical ICU practice in intervals of 6-12 and 24 hours.

The first study to demonstrate that pretherapuetic NLR can be used as a predictor of chemotherapy sensitivity to thoracic esophageal cancer was demonstrated by Hiroshi Sato, Yasuhiro Tsubosa, and Tatsuyuki Kawano in a 2012 study published in World Journal of Surgery journal.

References

Further reading
 for risk stratification for breast cancer

Immunologic tests